Benton County Airport  is a county-owned public-use airport located three nautical miles (4.8 km) south of the central business district of Camden, a city in Benton County, Tennessee, United States. This airport is included in the National Plan of Integrated Airport Systems for 2011–2015, which categorized it as a general aviation airport.

Facilities and aircraft 
Benton County Airport covers an area of 123 acres (49.7 ha) at an elevation of 468 feet (142 m) above mean sea level. It has one runway:  04/22 is 5,001 by 75 feet (1,524 x 23 m) with an asphalt pavement.

For the 12-month period ending June 30, 2012, the airport had 4,040 aircraft operations, an average of 11 per day: 99% general aviation, and 1% military. At that time there were 21 aircraft based at this airport: 61% single-engine, 28% multi-engine, and 9% ultralight.

References

External links 
 RediAir Flight Support, the fixed-base operator (FBO)
 
 

Airports in Tennessee
Buildings and structures in Benton County, Tennessee
Transportation in Benton County, Tennessee